Bronisław Fichtel (11 November 1896 – 1 September 1939) was a Polish footballer. He played in two matches for the Poland national football team from 1925 to 1926. He disappeared after being taken prisoner during the Soviet invasion of Poland in September 1939.

References

External links
 

1896 births
1939 deaths
Polish footballers
Poland international footballers
Sportspeople from Lviv Oblast
Association football defenders
Polish military personnel killed in World War II
Polish prisoners of war in World War II
World War II prisoners of war held by the Soviet Union
Polish people executed by the Soviet Union
Pogoń Lwów players
Polonia Warsaw players